The Lion Woman (in Norwegian: Løvekvinnen) is a novel by the Norwegian writer Erik Fosnes Hansen. It was published in 2006, and a film adaptation was released in 2016.

Story
The book tells the story of Eva Arctander, who was born with hypertrichosis, which causes an abnormal amount of hair growth over the body. The novel describes her life from birth until the age of 13 or 14. She is examined by doctors in a degrading manner and bullied at school. She falls in love and experiences respect and disrespect. The book opens with her as part of a traveling theater group along with others with rare diseases or abnormalities. The book then goes back in time, and describing her experiences in relation to her condition and the people she meets. The book alternates between first-person and third-person narration.

Reception
The book received very good reviews in many Norwegian newspapers. The author was praised for a well-written book and for his psychological insight. The audiobook edition, which was read by Fosnes Hansen himself, also received good reviews.

Awards

2006: Norwegian Booksellers' Prize.

Editions

2007: Cappelen Damm, paperback. 
2006: Cappelen Damm, audiobook, read by Erik Fosnes Hansen. 
2006: Cappelen Damm, hardcover. .

References

External links
Cappelen Damm: Description of the book

21st-century Norwegian novels
2006 novels
Norwegian novels adapted into films
Cappelen Damm books